Andreas Asimakopoulos (born 14 January 1889, date of death unknown) was a Greek swimmer. He competed in the men's 100 metre freestyle event at the 1912 Summer Olympics and the water polo tournaments at the 1920 Summer Olympics and the 1924 Summer Olympics.

References

External links
 

1889 births
Year of death missing
Greek male swimmers
Greek male water polo players
Olympic swimmers of Greece
Olympic water polo players of Greece
Swimmers at the 1912 Summer Olympics
Water polo players at the 1920 Summer Olympics
Water polo players at the 1924 Summer Olympics
Sportspeople from Alexandria
Greek male freestyle swimmers